Saskatchewan is the middle province of Canada's three Prairie Provinces. It has an area of 651,900 km² (251,700 mi²) and a population of 1,117,503 (Saskatchewanians) as of January 2014. Most of its  population lives in the southern half of the province. The most populous city is Saskatoon with a population of 260,600 (2011) in the Census Metropolitan Area (CMA), followed by the province's capital, Regina with a population of 210,556 (2011) in the CMA.  The province's population makeup is also notable for German being the largest European ethnic group and also for the second-largest proportion of people of indigenous descent of any of the provinces, after Manitoba.

Population history

† 1901 population for District of Saskatchewan and District of Athabasca, parts of the then-named North-West Territories.

Source: Statistics Canada.

Ethnic origins
Note:  The following statistics include a combination of individual and multiple responses from the 2001 Census, and therefore do not add up to 100%.
 German 28.6%
 Canadian 25.0%
 English 24.5%
 Scottish 17.9%
 Irish 14.5%
 Ukrainian 12.6%
 French 11.4%
 North American Indian 10.6%
 Norwegian 6.3% (the highest proportion of Canadians of Norwegian descent of any province)
 Polish 5.3%
 Métis 4.2%
 Dutch (Netherlands) 3.4%
 Swedish 3.1%
 Russian 2.9%
 Hungarian (Magyar) 2.5%
 Austrian 1.5%
 Welsh 1.4%
 American (USA) 1.2%
 Romanian 1.1%
 Danish 1.0%
 Chinese 1.0%

Future projections

Visible minorities and Aboriginals

Languages

Knowledge of languages

The question on knowledge of languages allows for multiple responses. The following figures are from the 2021 Canadian Census and the 2016 Canadian Census, and lists languages that were selected by at least one per cent of respondents.

Mother tongue

The 2006 census showed a population of 968,157. Of the 946,250 singular responses to the census question concerning mother tongue the languages most commonly reported were:

Note: "n.i.e.": not included elsewhere

There were also 175 single-language responses for Non-verbal languages (Sign languages); 170 for Amharic; 155 for Turkish; 140 for Sinhala; 135 for Slavic languages n.i.e.; 130 for Slovenian; 120 for Pashto;  115 for Malay; 115 for Malayalam; 115 for Thai; 110 for Ilocano; 110 for Khmer; 100 for Celtic languages; and 100 for Sino-Tibetan languages n.i.e. In addition there were also 6,080 responses of both English and a non-official language; 245 of both French and a non-official language; 1,130 of both English and French; and 140 of English, French and a non-official language. Figures shown are for the number of single language responses and the percentage of total single-language responses.

Religion

According to the Canada 2001 Census, the most practiced religions in the province were:
 Christianity:
 Protestantism: 449,195;
 Roman Catholicism: 305,390;
 Christian (n.i.e.): 27,070
 Orthodox: 14,280;
 Buddhism: 3,050;
 Islam: 2,230;
 Sikhism: 1,655;
 Hinduism: 1,585;
 Judaism: 865;

With increase immigration from highly religious countries such as the Philippines, the Christian population continues to rise, particularly the Catholic denomination, as well as small amounts of Protestants.
151,455 people declared themselves as without religion.

Migration

Immigration 

The 2021 census reported that immigrants (individuals born outside Canada) comprise 137,615 persons or 12.5 percent of the total population of Saskatchewan.

Recent immigration 
The 2021 Canadian census counted a total of 43,120 people who immigrated to Saskatchewan between 2016 and 2021.

Interprovincial migration

Interprovincial migration has long been a demographic challenge for Saskatchewan, and it was often said that "Saskatchewan's most valuable export [was] its young people". The trend reversed in 2006 as the nascent oil fracking industry started growing in the province, but returned to negative net migration starting in 2013. Most people migrating from Saskatchewan move west to Alberta or British Columbia.

Source: Statistics Canada

See also

Demographics of Canada
Population of Canada by province and territory

Notes

References

Saskatchewan
Saskatchewan society